Luciano Nequecaur (born 19 July 1992) is an Argentine-born Uruguayan footballer who plays as a forward for Huachipato. 
 Besides Uruguay, he has played in Argentina, Scotland, Mexico, Portugal and Chile.

References

External links
 
 

1992 births
Living people
Argentine footballers
Argentine expatriate footballers
Association football forwards
Club Atlético Lanús footballers
All Boys footballers
Stranraer F.C. players
Nueva Chicago footballers
Venados F.C. players
Alebrijes de Oaxaca players
C.S. Marítimo players
Danubio F.C. players
Centro Atlético Fénix players
C.D. Huachipato footballers
Argentine Primera División players
Primera Nacional players
Scottish Professional Football League players
Ascenso MX players
Primeira Liga players
Uruguayan Primera División players
Chilean Primera División players
Argentine expatriate sportspeople in Scotland
Argentine expatriate sportspeople in Mexico
Argentine expatriate sportspeople in Portugal
Argentine expatriate sportspeople in Uruguay
Argentine expatriate sportspeople in Chile
Uruguayan expatriate sportspeople in Scotland
Uruguayan expatriate sportspeople in Mexico
Uruguayan expatriate sportspeople in Portugal
Uruguayan expatriate sportspeople in Chile
Expatriate footballers in Scotland
Expatriate footballers in Mexico
Expatriate footballers in Portugal
Expatriate footballers in Uruguay
Expatriate footballers in Argentina
Expatriate footballers in Chile
Argentine emigrants to Uruguay
Naturalized citizens of Uruguay
Footballers from Buenos Aires

Uruguayan sportspeople of Italian descent